Efferia jubata is a species of robber flies in the family Asilidae.

References

Asilinae
Articles created by Qbugbot
Taxa named by Samuel Wendell Williston
Insects described in 1885